"Gourmandises" (English: "delicacies") is a song by Alizée, released in 2001. Like Alizée's previous singles, this too features a single version and an instrumental rendering.

Music video
The video for the single was directed by Nicolas Hidiroglou, and was premiered on 25 July 2001 in M6.
The video was nominated in 2002 in the EFD awards.
In the video Alizée is featured in a park with her friends, having a picnic complete with candy and fruits. Towards the last chorus of the video, all the delicacies spill, and Alizée and her friends run, play and laugh together. The entire video shows bliss.

Formats and track listings
CD-Single Polydor
Gourmandises (4:16)
Gourmandises (Instrumental) (4:10)

CD-Maxi Polydor
Gourmandises (Single Version) (4:10)
Gourmandises (Les Baisers Dance Mix) (8:25)
Gourmandises (Loup y es-tu ? Groovy Mix) (6:30)
Gourmandises (Remix Gourmand) (5:35)

Digital single
Gourmandises (4:16)

French 12" vinyl single

A Side :
Gourmandises (Les Baisers Dance Mix) (8:25)

B Side :
Gourmandises (Single Version) (4:10)
Gourmandises (Loup y es-tu ? Groovy Mix) (6:30)

Charts, certifications, sales

References

2001 singles
Alizée songs
Songs with music by Laurent Boutonnat
Songs with lyrics by Mylène Farmer
2000 songs
Polydor Records singles